Stara Gora pri Šentilju ( or ) is a small dispersed settlement in the Slovene Hills south of Šentilj v Slovenskih Goricah in the Municipality of Šentilj in northeastern Slovenia.

Name
The name of the settlement was changed from Stara Gora to Stara Gora pri Šentilju in 1953.

References

External links
Stara Gora pri Šentilju on Geopedia

Populated places in the Municipality of Šentilj